Jorge Enrique Lage (Havana, 1979) is a Cuban novelist and short story writer. He is also the editor of the magazine El cuentero and the publishing house Caja China of the Onelio Jorge Cardoso Literary Training Center.

Jorge Lage is the grandson of Iris Davila, a famous Cuban radio-plays novelist. Formed as a biochemist at Universidad de la Habana (1999-2003), he quit the biosciences right after graduating with honors for pursuing a career as a writer.

His stories have appeared in anthologies and magazines in Cuba and abroad.

Works
Short story books
 Yo fui un adolescente ladrón de tumbas (Extramuros, 2004)
 Fragmentos encontrados en La Rampa (April, 2004)
 Los ojos de fuego verde (April, 2005)
 El color de la sangre diluida (Letras Cubanas, 2007)
 Vultureffect (Unión, 2011)

Novels
 Carbono 14, una novela de culto (Altazor, Perú, 2010).

Awards
Jorge Enrique Lage has won numerous awards, including:

 Celestino de Cuento Award (2002)
 Luis Rogelio Nogueras Award (2003)
 Calendario Award, in Narrative (2003)
 Calendario Award, in Science Fiction (2004)

References 

1979 births
Cuban male short story writers
Cuban short story writers
Cuban male novelists
People from Havana
Living people